Rarities is the first compilation album by American alternative rock/post-grunge music group Smile Empty Soul.  The album has two different versions; 1 digital copy containing eight songs or one CD edition copy containing 13 songs. The album consists of five songs never before released, a handful of others that were only ever leaked out online, two soundtrack songs, a live acoustic version of an old song, and one re-record.

The album is scheduled to be released on 10 March 2017, in digital download and CD editions.

On 9 March 2017, thirteen songs from the CD edition were streamed via YouTube.

Track listing 
Digital download 

CD edition

Personnel
 Sean Danielsen – vocals, guitar
 Ryan Martin – bass
 Jake Kilmer – drums

References

2017 compilation albums
Smile Empty Soul albums
Albums produced by Eddie Wohl